The Muses are the inspirational goddesses of literature, science, and the arts in Greek mythology.

The Muse may also refer to:

 "The Muse" (Star Trek: Deep Space Nine), episode from the fourth season
 The Muse (film), 1999 film starring Albert Brooks and Sharon Stone
 The Muse (soundtrack), soundtrack by Elton John for the 1999 film of the same name
 The Muse (website), New York City based website career center
 The Muse, a section on Jezebel (website)
 The Muse (student paper) a student run newspaper based in St. John's, Newfoundland and Labrador
 The Muse, a song by Laura Marling from the album A Creature I Don't Know
 The Muse (album) by The Wood Brothers
 The Muse ARG, an alternate reality game created by Alex Bale

See also
 Muse (disambiguation)